

The first unprinted music magazine

SFX Cassette Magazine was a short-lived British music magazine published in the very early 1980s (not to be confused with SFX magazine, a best-selling science fiction magazine published continuously since 1995). The distinguishing feature of SFX was its format: rather than traditional print media, the magazine was distributed in the form of a one-hour cassette.  Magazines were sold as cassettes twist-tied to an 8-1/4" x 11-3/4" cardboard backing.  The tag line of each issue: "The Only Music Magazine on C-60."

The format of each issue was similar to a radio show, featuring news and interviews with pop stars (mostly but not exclusively British) and others involved with the music industry; reviews of record releases given by other musicians and artists; previews of upcoming album releases; unsigned band demo recordings; occasional features on culture, fashion and football (soccer); and three or four commercials per issue.

The concept was conceived and developed by Hugh Salmon, then a young account executive at Ogilvy & Mather Ogilvy (agency), and edited by the respected NME journalist, Max Bell. Among notable editorial coups, including Paul McCartney talking for the first time about his feelings of the murder of John Lennon, SFX provided the first opportunity for Jools Holland, keyboard player of Squeeze, and the young Paula Yates, a well-known figure on the music scene then going out with Bob Geldof. They both went on to present the TV programme The Tube.

The publication was short lived, running from November 1981 through the summer of 1982. There were at least 19 known issues published.  Taken as a whole, the SFX cassettes capture a narrow slice of music and pop culture as the punk/new wave movement was becoming more mainstream in content and performance.

1981 establishments in the United Kingdom
1982 disestablishments in the United Kingdom
Music magazines published in the United Kingdom
Defunct magazines published in the United Kingdom
Magazines established in 1981
Magazines disestablished in 1982

What became of its creators?

While Max Bell continued to write for a plethora of publications including The Daily Californian, LA Weekly and Rolling Stone, Hugh Salmon would eventually manage Ogilvy Thailand, Ogilvy’s fourth largest agency in the world with almost 400 employees. This would see him visiting Vietnam as one of the first Western businessmen to do so following the 'doi moi' reform policy at a time when US companies were still being embargoed. As a result, Ogilvy became the first advertising agency to open an office in Ho Chi Minh City, Vietnam. Subsequently, his report ‘Vietnam: from battleground to marketplace’ was published by Ogilvy worldwide.  Salmon would later become Managing Director of CM:Lintas in London and get embroiled in a five-year-long legal tussle to clear his name following accusations by the agency, which were eventually dropped by Lintas. The case was finally closed when Salmon was awarded significant damages and Lintas made a formal apology. Advertising aside, Salmon has written his first play, Into Battle, which was premiered at Greenwich Theatre in London in October 2021. The play tells the true story of a bitter feud between the privileged Old Etonians at Balliol College, Oxford and a more socially aware group of non-Etonians during the run-up to the First World War. Into Battle features a number of historically interesting characters including the wealthy socialite Ettie Grenfell, Baroness Desborough; her two sons Julian Grenfell (after whose poem the play is named) and Billy Grenfell; Patrick Shaw-Stewart, another war poet; Ronald Poulton, the distinguished rugby player; and the respected theologian Reverend Neville Talbot.

References